Laetesia is a genus of dwarf spiders that was first described by Eugène Louis Simon in 1908.

Species
 it contains twenty-five species, found in Australia, New Zealand, Thailand, and Vanuatu:
Laetesia amoena Millidge, 1988 – New Zealand
Laetesia asiatica Millidge, 1995 – Thailand
Laetesia aucklandensis (Forster, 1964) – New Zealand (Auckland Is.)
Laetesia bellissima Millidge, 1988 – New Zealand
Laetesia chathami Millidge, 1988 – New Zealand
Laetesia distincta Millidge, 1988 – New Zealand
Laetesia egregia Simon, 1908 – Australia (Western Australia)
Laetesia forsteri Wunderlich, 1976 – Australia (New South Wales)
Laetesia germana Millidge, 1988 – New Zealand
Laetesia intermedia Blest & Vink, 2003 – New Zealand
Laetesia leo van Helsdingen, 1972 – Australia (South Australia)
Laetesia minor Millidge, 1988 – New Zealand
Laetesia mollita Simon, 1908 (type) – Australia (Western Australia)
Laetesia nornalupiensis Wunderlich, 1976 – Australia (Western Australia)
Laetesia oceaniae (Berland, 1938) – Vanuatu
Laetesia olvidada Blest & Vink, 2003 – New Zealand
Laetesia paragermana Blest & Vink, 2003 – New Zealand
Laetesia peramoena (O. Pickard-Cambridge, 1880) – New Zealand
Laetesia prominens Millidge, 1988 – New Zealand
Laetesia pseudamoena Blest & Vink, 2003 – New Zealand
Laetesia pulcherrima Blest & Vink, 2003 – New Zealand
Laetesia raveni Hormiga & Scharff, 2014 – Australia (Queensland, New South Wales)
Laetesia trispathulata (Urquhart, 1886) – New Zealand
Laetesia weburdi (Urquhart, 1890) – Australia (New South Wales)
Laetesia woomeraensis Wunderlich, 1976 – Australia (South Australia)

See also
 List of Linyphiidae species (I–P)

References

Araneomorphae genera
Linyphiidae
Spiders of Asia
Spiders of Oceania